South Andros Airport  is an airport near Congo Town in South Andros, part of Andros Island in The Bahamas. It is also known as Congo Town Airport .

Facilities

Airlines and destinations

References

External links
 
 

Airports in the Bahamas
Andros, Bahamas